Stephen Gillmurphy, known professionally as thecatamites, is an Irish independent video game developer noted for his prolific career of publishing short independent freeware games, including Space Funeral. His games are typified by the use of self-drawn, mixed-media graphics and offbeat, satirical tone. Described as publishing "weird outsider games", Gillmurphy has received positive reception from independent game outlets.

Career 

Gillmurphy first started making games in 2008 using RPG Maker after exposure to the software in secondary school. He cites the independent games Wilfred The Hero by Brandon Abley and Psychosomnium by Jonatan Söderström as major influences to create his own art in video games, which are often composed of diverse handmade materials including Lego, paper cutouts, clay figurines, and scanned drawings. He has worked with a preference to developing short-form games, as illustrated by his 2014 compilation 50 Short Games, due to the shortness "giving (the games) a larger range" and reflecting the "practical impulse to compress and avoid unnecessary work." Gillmurphy states this approach was influenced by his experience with game jams, stating positive experiences with "shared constraints that kind of sync you up with other people".

Gillmurphy has distributed his games on several websites, including under the names Games 4 Schools, Mystery Zone, and Harmony Zone, the latter of which he has used to publish commercial titles including 50 Short Games. He has also published critical essays on Tumblr under the handle My Friend Pokey.

Acclaim 

Gillmurphy has received praise for his work from several outlets for its unique method of composition and unusual tone. Game Jolt praised Gillmurphy as possessing "one of the most exciting and original bodies of work in gaming", describing his games as "funny, surreal, boundary-pushing, and full of wonder over the possibilities of videogames and the worlds they can create." Brendan Caldwell of Rock Paper Shotgun praised Gillmurphy's writing, stating that it possesses an odd humor...that lies somewhere between absurdity and academia," and complimented his worldbuilding as "self-contained asylums of weirdness." Writing for Game Developer, Mike Rose stated that he "isn't like other developers," noting "the underlying mechanics of play will often force you into the sort of silly and sometimes uncomfortable territory that video games simply don't explore."

Personal life 

Gillmurphy was born in Inchicore, a suburb of Dublin, Ireland, and studied as a mathematics student. In 2012, Gillmurphy briefly worked in a full-time role as an insurance broker in Dublin. He is noted as being reticent to discuss his personal life on the Internet, preferring to "stay in the shadows."

Works 

Under the name thecatamites and Harmony Zone, Gillmurphy has self-published several independent games, listed below:

References

Irish video game designers
Indie video game developers
Living people
Video game writers
People from Dublin (city)
Year of birth missing (living people)